Zebulon Moses Farm Complex is a historic home and farm complex located at Lima in Livingston County, New York. The farmhouse is believed to date to the early 19th century and was modernized and expanded in several stages throughout the later 19th century. It is a two-story, four-bay dwelling with three large rear appendages. The property also includes a carriage barn with an attached shed, three barns, and a machine shed.

It was listed on the National Register of Historic Places in 1989.

References

Houses on the National Register of Historic Places in New York (state)
Houses in Livingston County, New York
National Register of Historic Places in Livingston County, New York
Farms on the National Register of Historic Places in New York (state)